James Thomas (born 17 August 1990, Newport, Wales) is a Welsh rugby union player. A Number 8 forward, he has represented Wales at Under-18 and Under-20 level.

Thomas played for Blackwood RFC, Ebbw Vale RFC, the Newport Gwent Dragons Under-20 regional team and Newport RFC. He made his debut for the Dragons senior team versus Sale Sharks on 6 November 2009 as a second-half replacement.

On 22 December 2009 he was named in the Wales Under 20 Squad for the 2010 Under-20 Six Nations tournament. In May 2010 he was selected in the Wales Under 20 Squad for the Junior World Cup in Argentina in June 2010.

Thomas left the Dragons in December 2018.

References

External links
Dragons profile

Welsh rugby union players
Dragons RFC players
1990 births
Living people
Rugby union players from Newport, Wales
Newport RFC players
Ebbw Vale RFC players
Rugby union number eights